Urs Luterbacher (born November 5, 1944) is a Swiss political scientist who applies models and game theory to international conflict and cooperation and international environmental problems. He is a co-editor of the 2001 volume International Relations and Global Climate Change.

After graduating from high school in Biel, Luterbacher studied political science at the University of Geneva and, after a period as a research assistant at the University of Michigan, received his doctorate in 1974 from the Graduate Institute for International Studies (IUHEI) in Geneva. From 1977 to 2010 he was a professor at the same institute (since 2008, Graduate Institute of International Studies and Development, IHEID). In 1984 he was a visiting professor at the University of Nebraska, and from 1990 to 1991 at the University of Michigan.

Luterbacher is a member of ProClim, the forum for climate and global environmental change of the Swiss Academies of Arts and Sciences.

References

1944 births
Living people
Academic staff of the University of Geneva
Political scientists
21st-century Swiss scientists
21st-century political scientists
Graduate Institute of International and Development Studies alumni
Academic staff of the Graduate Institute of International and Development Studies